Magyarcsanád is a multi-ethnic village located in Csongrád-Csanád County, southeastern Hungary, near the Mureș River. The Maros is a border-river here between southern Hungary and northern Romania.

The population is mainly Hungarian, but many Romanians, Serbs and Romani people also live here. Magyarcsanád has four churches: a Roman Catholic, a Calvinist, a Serbian Orthodox, and a Romanian Orthodox one.

The village has an own outskirt called Bökény directly near the Maros. Here is a tumulus in which archeological artifacts were found.

Magyarcsanád has a partner-settlement, Comloșu Mare, in Timiș County, Romania.

An old stone cross was erected near Magyarcsanád in the Middle Ages. The cross still stands.

There is a small isle called 'Senki szigete' some kilometers eastward from Magyarcsanád on the border river Maros. The isle is inhabited by Phalacrocoracidae (Phalacrocorax carbo).

References

External links
 Vendégváró (Hungarian)
 (Térképcentrum, Hungarian, with map)
 Gyalogló (Hungarian)
 Hungarian Central Statistical Office about Magyarcsanád (English)
 Csongrád County Government about Magyarcsanád (Hungarian)
 (satellite map, in the centre-right in Google Map) 

Populated places in Csongrád-Csanád County
Serb communities in Hungary